Cassina de' Pecchi is a suburban station on Line 2 of the Milan Metro in the municipality of the same name.

History
The station was opened in 1968, as a stop on the Milan-Gorgonzola fast tramway line. Since 4 December 1972 the section from Cascina Gobba to Gorgonzola, where this station is located, was connected to Milan Metro Line 2 and operates as part of it ever since.

Station structure 

The station has two covered platforms and two tracks. It is located on the approximately 144 meters long viaduct across the Martesana channel. The viaduct was designed by engineer Silvano Zorzi. The passenger building is located in a sort of mezzanine integrated into the structure, under the tracks at the western end of the platforms.

References

Bibliography
 Giovanni Cornolò, Fuori porta in tram. Le tranvie extraurbane milanesi, Parma, Ermanno Arbertelli, 1980.
 Elio Ceron, Sergio Farné, La progettazione e la costruzione delle Linee Celeri dell'Adda, in "Ingegneria Ferroviaria", novembre 1995, pp. 1001–1022.

 

Line 2 (Milan Metro) stations
Railway stations opened in 1981
1981 establishments in Italy
Railway stations in Italy opened in the 20th century